Ahinsa Sthal is a Jain temple located in Mehrauli, Delhi. The main deity of the temple is Mahavira, the 24th and last Tirthankara (human spiritual guide) of Avasarpiṇī (present half cycle of time). A magnificent statue of Tirthankara Mahāvīra is installed here.

Statue 
The statue of Mahavira was carved out of a granite rock in Karkala in Lotus position. The height of the statue is 13 feet 6 inches. Its weight is around 30 tonnes. The height of the lotus pedestal is 2 feet 8 inches and it weighs around 17 tonnes.

Gallery

See also

 Sri Digambar Jain Lal Mandir
 Jainism in Delhi

References

Citation

Sources 
 
 

Jain temples in Delhi
20th-century Jain temples
20th-century architecture in India